Lygropia acosmialis is a moth in the family Crambidae. It was described by Paul Mabille in 1879. It is found in Madagascar and Zambia.

References

Moths described in 1879
Lygropia